The Scion xA is a five-door subcompact hatchback marketed in the US from 2004-2006 — as an export model of the Japanese domestic market Toyota Ist. Based on the first generation Toyota Vitz hatchback, the xA shared a platform with the Toyota Platz sedan.

The xA received a minor facelift for the 2006 model year, before importation ended in December 2006. The xA's successor, the xD was delivered to US dealerships beginning in August 2007 as a 2008 model.

Technical data 

Engine:
1.5 L DOHC I4 engine.
108 hp (81 kW) @ 6000 rpm (revised to 103 SAE net horsepower in 2006)
Platform: NCP61
Cargo volume: 11.7 ft³ (331 L)
EPA fuel economy ratings:

2008 EPA revised fuel economy ratings for the 2004 model are /  for both manual and automatic transmission. For the 2005 and 2006 models, fuel economy is estimated at / for vehicles with a manual transmission and / for those with an automatic transmission.
Drag Coefficient: 0.31
0-60 mph: 8.8 seconds
1/4 mile: 16.7 seconds at 
Top Speed: Limited to 110 mph

Some of the revisions for 2006 include modified bumpers and side skirts, as well as turn signal indicators on the side mirrors and audio controls located on the steering wheel. The xA was also the first production vehicle to offer an optional iPod input with head unit display, as well as a more refined, user-friendly head unit and more exterior colors.

Release series 
Beginning in late spring 2004 with the launch of the 2004 Scion xB RS 1.0 (Release Series 1.0) Scion decided to create limited edition vehicles pre-packaged with exclusive accessories in limited quantities. Limited Edition vehicles from a marketing standpoint were used to create a buzz for the brandname, with their exterior colors tending to be loud or bright hues (i.e. orange, yellow, red, blue, green). Because of the growing popularity of the Scion product line and the scarce production runs (most dealers only got 2-3 of each RS model), these limited edition vehicles quickly sell out. Preordering is available at each dealership on a first-come, first-served basis. To the customer's benefit, Scion's "Pure Price" MSRP binds dealerships against market-demand vehicle mark-up. Naturally, resale values of Release Series vehicles command a premium because of their packaged options and scarcity.

2005

 xA RS 1.0: Available only in Absolutely Red, standard equipment included a sports grille and color-keyed rear spoiler, power Webasto factory moonroof, 6 spoke alloy wheels, color-keyed ground effects and vehicle stability control (VSC). Only 1,550 units were produced

2005

 xA RS 2.0 only available in Spectra Blue Mica with 1,700 units produced

2006

 xA RS 3.0 only available in Stingray Metallic light blue with 2,100 units produced

Sales

References

External links 

Scion To Launch Two New Models In The Spring of 2007 To Replace Current Generation xA And xB

xA
Subcompact cars
Front-wheel-drive vehicles
Hatchbacks
2000s cars